Derviş Zaim (born Derviş Zaimağaoğlu in 1964) is a Turkish Cypriot filmmaker and novelist, who has twice won the Golden Orange for Best Director for Elephants and Grass (2000) and Dot (2008); Golden Oranges for Best Film and Best Screenplay for Somersault in a Coffin (1996); and the Yunus Nadi literary prize for his debut novel Ares in Wonderland (1995).

Biography 
Derviş Zaim was educated at Famagusta Namık Kemal High School and graduated in Business Administration from Boğaziçi University in 1988. He attended a course in independent film production in London and made experimental video Hang the Camera (1991). He subsequently wrote, produced and directed numerous television programs starting with the documentary Rock around the Mosque (1993). He completed his master's degree in Cultural Studies at the University of Warwick in 1994.  His first novel, Ares in Wonderland (1995), won the prestigious Yunus Nadi literary prize in Turkey.

Somersault in a Coffin (1996) was his debut as director and screenwriter, which won awards at film festivals in Antalya, Montpellier, San Francisco, Thessalonika and Torino. He followed it with Elephants and Grass (2000), which won awards at film festivals in Antalya and Istanbul, and Mud (2003), which won the UNESCO Award at the Venice Film Festival.

He co-directed the documentary Parallel Trips (2004) with Panicos Chrysanthou, in which the two directors, from opposite sides of the divided island of Cyprus, recorded the human dramas that unfolded during the war of 1974 and the legacy that remains today. He later produced the Greek Cypriot director's fictional feature debut Akamas (2006) about a love affair between a Turkish Cypriot and Greek Cypriot.

He made a trilogy of films, themed around traditional Turkish arts, consisting of Waiting for Heaven (2006), which was nominated for the Golden Tulip at the Istanbul International Film Festival, Dot (2008), which won awards at film festivals in Antalya and Istanbul, and Shadows and Faces (2010), which won the Turkish Film Critics Association Award at the 47th International Antalya Golden Orange Film Festival.

He also teaches at Istanbul Bilgi University and Boğaziçi University.

Filmography

References

External links 
 

1964 births
Living people
People from Famagusta
Turkish Cypriot expatriates in Turkey
Cypriot film directors
Turkish Cypriot film directors
Turkish Cypriot film producers
Films directed by Derviş Zaim
Best Screenplay Golden Orange Award winners
Best Director Golden Orange Award winners
Alumni of the University of Warwick
Boğaziçi University alumni
Academic staff of Boğaziçi University
Turkish Cypriot expatriates in the United Kingdom